The 1913 Marshall Thundering Herd football team represented Marshall College (now Marshall University) in the 1913 college football season. Marshall posted a 3–4 record, being outscored by its opposition 39–101. Home games were played on a campus field called "Central Field" which is presently Campus Commons.

Schedule

References

Marshall
Marshall Thundering Herd football seasons
Marshall Thundering Herd football